The 1994 Iowa State Cyclones football team represented Iowa State University during the 1994 NCAA Division I-A football season.  They played their home games at Cyclone Stadium in Ames, Iowa. They participated as members of the Big Eight Conference.  The team was coached by head coach Jim Walden, who retired from coaching after the conclusion of the season.

Schedule

Personnel

References

Iowa State
Iowa State Cyclones football seasons
Iowa State Cyclones football